Homalopoma nocturnum is a species of sea snail, a marine gastropod mollusk in the family Colloniidae.

Description
The size of the shell varies between 4 mm and 7 mm. The small, solid shell has a globose shape. It has 4-4½ rotund whorls, marked with subgranulose transverse ribs. The suture is obvious. The rotund aperture is iridescent and pearly within. The lip is thickened.

Distribution
This marine species occurs off Southern Japan.

References

 Lee, J.J., 1990. Bioecological study of the northern coastal area in Chenju Island. Korean Journal of Malacology 6(1):33–44

External links
 

Colloniidae
Gastropods described in 1861